Oliver Stević (born 18 January 1984) is a Serbian professional basketball player for Herbalife Gran Canaria of the Liga ACB.

In early 2020, he joined Club Joventut Badalona of the Spanish League and Eurocup. Stević signed with Fuenlabrada on 22 October 2020, having played with the team during the 2015–16 season. On 29 November 2020 he signed with Herbalife Gran Canaria of the Liga ACB. Stević extended his contract with the team on 3 July 2021.

References

External links
 Oliver Stević at eurobasket.com
 Oliver Stević at euroleague.com
 Oliver Stević at acb.com
 Oliver Stević at Legabasket
 Oliver Stević at TBLstat.net

1984 births
Living people
ABA League players
A.S. Junior Pallacanestro Casale players
Baloncesto Fuenlabrada players
Basketball League of Serbia players
Basket Zielona Góra players
BC Andorra players
Bilbao Basket players
CB Gran Canaria players
Gaziantep Basketbol players
KK Borac Čačak players
KK Crvena zvezda players
KK FMP (1991–2011) players
KK Igokea players
KK Mašinac players
KK Włocławek players
Lega Basket Serie A players
Liga ACB players
Power forwards (basketball)
Serbian expatriate basketball people in Andorra
Serbian expatriate basketball people in Bosnia and Herzegovina
Serbian expatriate basketball people in Germany
Serbian expatriate basketball people in Italy
Serbian expatriate basketball people in Poland
Serbian expatriate basketball people in Slovenia
Serbian expatriate basketball people in Spain
Serbian expatriate basketball people in Turkey
Serbian men's basketball players
Śląsk Wrocław basketball players
People from Nova Gorica